The National Identity Card or NID card is a compulsory identity document issued to every Bangladeshi citizen upon turning 18 years of age. The NID is a government issued photo ID just like the Bangladeshi Driver's license, which is also a biometric, microchip embedded, smart identity card. The NID is required by Bangladeshi citizens for multiple essential public services, such as obtaining utility connections, as well as private services, such as opening bank accounts, in Bangladesh. Initially, paper based laminated NID cards were issued since 2006. Then, the paper based laminated NID cards were replaced by biometric and microchip embedded Smart NID cards for all adult citizens in Bangladesh from 2016 onwards. This was done to ensure security for the cardholder as well as prevent counterfeiting and fraudulence. The government provides the Smart NID card free of charge to all adult citizens of Bangladesh.

History
Biometric identification has existed in Bangladesh since 2008. Bangladesh Election Commission introduced paper laminated National Identity cards through its project named Preparation of Electoral Roll with Photograph (PERP), a UNDP led donor funded project. The first National Project Director was Brigadier General Shahadat Hossain Chowdhury, afwc, psc, te. The project was designed for preparation of electoral roll with photographs for the Ninth Parliamentary Election held in December 2008. A demographic and biometric database was created for 81.3 million Bangladeshi citizens who were eligible to be voters. All Bangladeshis who are 18 years of age or older are issued identity cards and included in a central biometric database, which is used by the Bangladesh Election Commission to oversee the electoral procedure in Bangladesh. Before 2016, only normal identity cards were issued which only included the ID holder's name; father's and mother's names; date of birth; ID number; photo; thumb and index fingerprints; and signature. These paper based laminated NID cards were easy to counterfeit. However, starting in October 2016, they were replaced by biometric, microchip embedded, smart identity cards in order to ensure security for the cardholder as well as prevent counterfeiting and fraudulence. The smart NID cards include all ten fingerprints in addition to other biometric and identity information.

Smart National Identity Card
The National Identity Registration Wing (NIDW) of the Bangladesh Election Commission introduced the Smart National Identity Card in October 2016. This card has an integrated circuit embedded in it, and it is also known as a "chip-based card" or "smart NID card" in Bangladesh. It is a pocket-sized plastic card, almost the size of a credit card, with the embedded integrated circuit storing all the data. To maintain the security of the smart card, twenty-five international certifications and standards have been ensured. Since they are machine-readable cards, the smart cards have additional safety measures to prevent forgery. The cardholders currently receive twenty-two different types of services including banking, electronic Tax Identification Number 63(e-TIN), driving license, passport, etc.
nid number 9162087580
07/11/2003 If change now 07/08/2000

Key facilities
The following facilities and services are available to citizens with the Bangladeshi smart NID card:
 Citizens' rights and benefit
 National identity change date of birth 07/08/2000
national id number 9162087580

 Driving license
 Passport
 Property land buying and selling
 Open Bangladeshi bank accounts
 Account Check
 Bank loan support
 Government pensions
 Government financial aid or support
 BIN facility
 Share-BO account maintainers
 Business trade license
 Vehicle registration
 Insurance schemes
 Marriage registration
 E-passports
 E-governance
 Gas and electricity connections
 Mobile connect
 Health cards
 E-cash
 Bank transactions
 Students' admission facilities

Requirements
Updating the list of eligible voters is an ongoing process under the election commission. Bangladeshi citizens who have frequently lived in an area and are 18 years or above, but not yet registered as a voter, may register. At the time of enrollment, they need the following supporting documents in addition to the application form:
 SSC or equivalent certificate
 Birth certificate
 Passport, driving license, or TIN certificate (if available)
 Utility bill copy, house rent receipt, or holding tax receipt (as proof of address)
 Citizenship certificate (if applicable)
 Attested photocopy of Father, mother, husband, or wife's NID
 Has to be physically present at EC premises for photo and biometric data collection

References

External links
 Official website
 NID Registration online 

Government of Bangladesh
National identity cards by country
Immigration to Bangladesh
Identity documents of Bangladesh